The Drinkard Singers were an American gospel singing group, most successful in the late 1950s and important in the careers of singers Cissy Houston, Dionne Warwick, Dee Dee Warwick, and Judy Clay.

Family origins
Nitcholas (aka Nitch, 1896–1952) and Delia Mae Drinkard (née McCaskill; 1901–1941) who had eight children - sons William (1918–2003), Hansom (1925–1986), Nicky (1929–1992), and Larry (1931–2012), and daughters Lee (1920–2005), Marie (1922–2007), Anne (1927–2003) and Emily "Cissy" (b. 1933). The Drinkard surname, although gained through a Native American ancestor, has British origins with a meaning that alludes to the running of water. 

Nitcholas Drinkard was born to a part Dutch, part African-American, mother Susan Bell Drinkard (née Fuller; b. 1876) and a full Native American father John Drinkard Jr. (b. 1870). He was descended from a family of African-American landowners in Blakely, Georgia where three of his children were born. The Drinkards owned a substantial amount of farmland during a time when it was unusual for blacks to own large portions of land. The asset was gradually depleted as small portions of the land were sold, over time, to resolve the continued legal troubles of a close relative. 

The family moved to New Jersey during the Great Migration. In 1938, mother Delia suffered a stroke and died of a cerebral hemorrhage three years later. Nitcholas died of stomach cancer in 1951.

Musical career
The driving inspiration behind the Drinkard Singers was factory worker Nitcholas "Nitch" Drinkard, who encouraged his children to form a gospel singing group in Newark, New Jersey, around 1938, becoming known as the Drinkard Quartet. The original group comprised Emily Drinkard (later known as Cissy Houston), her sister Anne Drinkard-Moss, and her brothers Nick and Larry. Another sister, Lee Drinkard Warrick, the mother of Dee Dee and Dionne Warwick, served as the group's manager.

Sister Marie later joined the group, leading to them changing the name to the Drinkard Singers. Anne Drinkard-Moss left and was replaced by Lee's adopted daughter Judy Guions, who was later known as Judy Clay. Performing regularly in Newark and all over New Jersey and New York, they recorded several singles. After an appearance at the 1957 Newport Jazz Festival, they recorded the first gospel album to appear on a major label, the live album A Joyful Noise, for RCA Records in 1959.

After several personnel changes in the early 1960s, the remaining members of the group in 1967 became The Sweet Inspirations, who would sing background for the Warwick sisters, Aretha Franklin and Elvis Presley.

References

External links
 The Drinkard Singers singing "Lift Him Up" 
 Drinkard Singers at Newport 1957
 Blessed Be The Name of The Lord - Dionne Warwick and the Drinkard Singers

American gospel musical groups
Musical groups from New Jersey
African-American musical groups
Musical groups established in 1938
African-American history in Newark, New Jersey